Christopher Fontaine (born December 1, 1981) is an American former professional stock car racing driver. He has competed in the NASCAR Gander RV & Outdoors Truck Series, driving in 59 races, most notably for Glenden Enterprises. He is known for his nickname “Uncle Chris”, which he goes by through his social media presence.

Beginnings
Chris Fontaine began racing at the age of 16, driving Minicup racecars. In his first years of driving, he racked up two wins, and finished in the top five in thirteen of his fourteen races. He also won many other Late Model races in the FASCAR and SARA Series. 

In 2001, Fontaine ran the NASCAR All Pro Series. In 2002, Fontaine attempted to make his debut in the NASCAR Busch Series, using a car purchased from NEMCO Motorsports; he failed to qualify for races at Memphis Motorsports Park, Dover International Speedway, and Nashville Superspeedway.

Returning to FASCAR and All-American Challenge Series competition for the next two seasons, Fontaine posted a career best points finish of fifth after the 2004 AACS season.

ASA and NASCAR
In 2005 Fontaine made his first ever start in NASCAR competition at the national series level. Driving in the Craftsman Truck Series for Bobby Hamilton Racing, he finished seventeenth at Mansfield Motorsports Park. He also drove in two more races that year, at the Milwaukee Mile, and the Kansas Speedway. At Kansas, Fontaine was involved in a spectacular wreck with Kelly Sutton, after making contact with Sutton's truck, flipping her over.

In 2007, he finished 5th in the American Speed Association Late Model Southern Division points. he also finished 3rd in Rookie Points in 2007. Fontaine made two more starts in the NASCAR Craftsman Truck Series in 2007. He drove for Xpress Motorsports, getting his best finish of 17th at Mansfield Motorsports Park. For the 2009 season, Fontaine teamed up with Glenden Enterprises to race a handful of races in the NASCAR Camping World Truck Series in his own trucks. At Gateway International Raceway, he earned his career best finish of 13th. 

For 2010, Fontaine ran 7 races with Glenden, having an impressive run at Talladega, leading 15 laps before finishing 19th. In 2011, Fontaine returned to Daytona International Speedway in the Trucks and qualified 6th but was caught up in a large wreck near the end. For 2012, Fontaine returned to the Camping World Truck Series, running the majority of the season; he scored his first top-ten in the series in the season opener at Daytona International Speedway, finishing seventh.

In 2014, Fontaine scored his 2nd career top-ten finish at Talladega Superspeedway, finishing 7th. For 2015, Fontaine continued to enter in select superspeedway races while making his debut at Eldora Speedway with B. J. McLeod Motorsports, finishing 16th. At Talladega, Fontaine scored his 3rd career top-ten finish, finishing eighth. In 2016, Fontaine entered in 4 races with Glenden Enterprises in the number 78, failing to qualify at Martinsville Speedway and Eldora Speedway, while managing to qualify for both Daytona and Talladega.

Fontaine's last race with the truck chassis "Freak", a truck that Fontaine had bought in 2009 from Bobby Hamilton Racing that had won at Daytona three times, came in 2018 at Talladega Superspeedway, where he was running inside the top five and crashed after making contact with Justin Haley.

Personal life
He is a graduate of George W. Jenkins High School. He is married to his middle school girlfriend Lindsay (Moyer) Fontaine. They have been married since April 7, 2019.  His younger cousin Justin used to compete full-time in the Truck Series.

In 2005, Fontaine was accused of rape following an evening out at a nightclub. Although he maintained innocence, he negotiated a plea deal in which adjuciation was withheld, and he was ordered to attend anger management classes, as well as undergoing psychological evaluation and sensitivity training.

Motorsports career results

NASCAR
(key) (Bold – Pole position awarded by qualifying time. Italics – Pole position earned by points standings or practice time. * – Most laps led.)

Xfinity Series

Gander Outdoors Truck Series

 Season still in progress
 Ineligible for series points

References

External links
 
 
 

Living people
1981 births
Sportspeople from Lakeland, Florida
Racing drivers from Florida
NASCAR drivers
American Speed Association drivers
CARS Tour drivers
George W. Jenkins High School alumni